Simone Schweber is Goodman Professor of Education and Jewish Studies at the University of Wisconsin–Madison.

References 

Stanford Graduate School of Education alumni
Swarthmore College alumni
University of Wisconsin–Madison faculty
American education writers
Judaic scholars
Holocaust studies